Torshov is one of the tram stops on the Oslo Tramway network. Located in the borough of Sagene in Oslo, Norway, it is served by three tram routes, two night bus services and a bus stop is located within walking distance and is served by route 20 of Ruter's extensive bus network. Trams began serving the area where the station is currently located since the 29th of September, 1899.

Service 
The station is served by three tram lines, Line 11, Line 12 and Line 18. On Hegermanns gate, there is a bus stop which is served by Line 20. The station itself is located on Vogts gate, the major street running throughout the area of Torshov. Night bus services also operate here from 2 AM until 5 to 6 AM. Torshov is also near Bentsebrugata, where trams on the former Sagene line used to run. The station is located between Biermanns gate and Sandaker senter.

Former Depot 
When the line was extended to Grefsen station in 1899, the former depot at Thorvald Meyers gate 47 near Olaf Ryes plass was closed down and replaced with the Torshov depot. It was created by Kristiania Sporveisselskab with the capability of storing 28 trams. It was located at Torshovgata 33. During the Second World War, this was where Oslo's first trolleybus was parked. The depot was taken out of use in 1977, after the new depot at Grefsen was established. It was disused until it became a cultural center & a theatre in 2003. The cultural centre is still in use as "Oslo Nye Trikkestallen".

References 

Oslo Tramway stations
Oslo Tramway stations in Oslo